Italy–Ukraine relations are the bilateral relations between Italy and Ukraine. Italy has an embassy in Kyiv. Ukraine has an embassy in Rome and consulates in Milan and Naples.

Italy recognized Ukraine's independence on 28 December 1991 and official diplomatic relations  began on 29 January 1992.

Political and diplomatic relations 
In March 2012, the Vice-Ministers of Foreign Affairs of the two countries met in Rome to discuss political topics. In June of the same year, Ukraine's Foreign Affairs Minister Kostyantyn Gryshchenko met  Italy's then Vice-Minister of Foreign Affairs Marta Dassù in Trieste in the context of a Central European Initiative Summit.

Since the beginning of the 2022 Russian invasion of Ukraine, bilateral relations between Italy and Ukraine have changed. The Italian government, through the Ministry of Foreign Affairs, declared its “strong condemnation of Russia’s unjustified and unprovoked aggression against Ukraine”. Italy has also underlined the violation of international law perpetrated by Russian authorities and has expressed its full support for the territorial integrity of Ukraine. Like other European nations and the European Commission itself, Italy supports the EU's action to isolate and exert economic pressure on Russia.

Initially, the government of Italy was not manifestly determined to impose economic sanctions on Russia as a form of countermeasure after the breakout of the war. The Ukrainian president Volodymir Zelenskyy, through his official Twitter account, then criticised Italian Prime Minister Mario Draghi for his reluctance to apply more severe sanctions against Russia. Subsequently, Italian support to the Ukrainian resistance became stronger: for example the Italian Ministry of Culture has offered to rebuild the Donetsk Academic Regional Drama Theater of Mariupol.

Italy was a supporter of the Minsk Agreements for the cessation of armed conflict and establishing a dialogue with Russia.

State visits
Ukraine's president has visited the Italian Republic several times: in May 1995, in November 2002, in October 2008, in November 2015 and in February 2020. The President of the Italian Republic visited Ukraine in 1996 and in 1999, whereas the Italian Prime Minister went to Ukraine in October 2003 and in March 2015.

Economic relations 
According to 2021 data, Italy is the second largest export market for Ukraine with €3,288 million of export values, and the fourth largest EU exporter to Ukraine with  €2,113 million of export values.

The strongest connection in the economic field between Italy and Ukraine lies in the trade of metallurgical products: in 2021 Italy imported metallurgical goods from Ukraine for a total value of 1 billion euros. In the agri-food industry sector, the economic exchange amounts to about 300 million euros, mostly in the exchange of wheat. Italy exports to Ukraine mainly machinery and equipment, tobacco, chemicals, clothing, and food products.

According to the latest available data (2017), there are 175 Italian companies in Ukraine, with 6692 employees and an aggregate revenue of 433 million euros per year. The main Italian firms present in Ukraine are Ferrero, Intesa Sanpaolo, Eni, Mapei, Saipem, and Selex.

Another relevant socio-economic phenomenon is the migration of Ukrainian women in Italy. 78,6% of the aggregate Ukrainian population in Italy consists of women, most of whom work in the care of old and disabled people.

For Italy, Ukraine is also important for its role in the development of gas import routes.

See also  
 Ukrainians in Italy 
 Ukraine–European Union relations

References

External links 
Official website of the Ukrainian Embassy in Italy .
Official website of the Italian Embassy in Ukraine.

Foreign relations of Italy
Foreign relations of Ukraine